Addison Lee is a British  private hire cab and courier company based in London, England. It was founded in 1975 by John Griffin.

Founding
The company was founded by John Griffin as Pacecroft Limited in 1975. Griffin was convinced that his new company needed a name which started with an "A" for it to appear early in telephone directory listings. A colleague who lived in a squat in Addison Gardens said people seemed to think this was a very posh address, which Griffin supplemented with Lee. Addison Lee was founded in 1975, with half the company owned by investor Lenny Foster.

Currently
The company operates a fleet of 4,000 vehicles with annual revenues of over £900m. The company carries out over 20,000 jobs every day.

Addison Lee has achieved both the ISO 9002 and the Investors in People accreditation.

History

Takeover
In April 2013 it was announced that the Carlyle Group, a private equity firm, would be purchasing the company for an undisclosed sum, reported to be £300m. John Griffin initially remained as chairman with son Liam Griffin replacing Daryl Foster as CEO. The Carlyle Group intend to grow the firm nationally and internationally.

John Griffin departs, new senior hires
During 2014 Addison Lee announced several senior hires including Peter Boucher (CCO), Catherine Faiers (Ops Director), Gary Cust (Chief Council), Nick Kotsis (Data Scientist) and Nick Constantinou (Head of Marketing). In media interviews in October 2014 it was announced that founder John Griffin had stepped down earlier that year and is no longer involved with the company.

Technology
Addison Lee relies heavily on information technology to automate and streamline the process of managing the large number of drivers and jobs, through the use of driver PDAs, GPS tracking and text messaging.

Addison Lee's use of technology has played an important part in reducing emissions and led to several awards, including Best Large Private Sector Fleet in Energy Saving Trust Fleet Hero Awards 2011. Addison Lee is a member of Mayor of London Boris Johnson’s "Green500" initiative.

Addison Lee's software has also been applied to other industries by the company's software partner, Haulmont Technology. The first client announced was JBW, an Enforcement Agency company.

Controversy
In April 2012, Addison Lee's chairman John Griffin instructed all of its drivers to begin using bus lanes, against the will of Transport for London. Griffin argued that allowing only licensed black taxis to use the lanes was "unfair discrimination". Griffin also secured a judicial review against Hackney Carriage legislation saying it was archaic.

John Griffin said the firm would "indemnify any fines or payments" that the firm's drivers would incur. In April 2012 the High Court ruled that Addison Lee could not encourage or instruct its drivers to use bus lanes.

In the April 2012 edition of Addison Lee's corporate magazine Add Lib, John Griffin used his editorial piece to voice his opinion that collisions with cyclists were unavoidable, and not the fault of his drivers.  He concluded:  "It is time for us to say to cyclists, ‘You want to join our gang, get trained and pay up’." This has caused a reaction from London's cycling community, including the London Cycling Campaign, CTC, Levenes Cycle and the London Fixed-Gear and Single-Speed forum, who have started taking action boycotting Addison Lee cabs by leaving negative reviews on the company's iPhone app, organizing protests, and calling for people to lobby their companies to stop their Addison Lee accounts.

Dr. Belinda Web started an e-petition with HM Government to have Addison Lee's license withdrawn. This caused a reaction from London's cycling community, including the London Cycling Campaign.

On 26 April 2012, the Chief Procurement Officer confirmed that the UK Government (OP71) contract with Addison Lee would be terminated at the end of April 2012.

In 2015, following reports that a small number of Addison Lee drivers had kicked same-sex couples out of their cars, the company introduced a diploma for its drivers, which includes equality training.

In September 2017, Addison Lee lost a tribunal case brought by Leigh Day, which sought to grant employees rights such as the minimum wage and holiday pay.

Accessibility
On 19 October 2015, Addison Lee introduced CycleCab, a new service allowing up to two passengers to travel in a cab with one bicycle. The service launched alongside the Six Day London track event at Lee Valley VeloPark.

Former operations
Between July 2006 and April 2013, Addison Lee operated the Redwing Coaches business.

References

External links
 

Companies based in the City of Westminster
Transport companies established in 1975
Taxi companies
Taxis of London
Motorcycle taxis
1975 establishments in England